Vandeventer Flat is a flat in Riverside County, California. It lies at the elevation,  between the San Jacinto Mountains and Santa Rosa Mountains.

References

Landforms of Riverside County, California